Valentina Cavallar (born 7 March 2001) is an Austrian rower. She competed in the women's lightweight double sculls event at the 2020 Summer Olympics.

References

External links
 

2001 births
Living people
Austrian female rowers
Olympic rowers of Austria
Rowers at the 2020 Summer Olympics
Place of birth missing (living people)
21st-century Austrian women